Gambria is a genus of beetles in the family Cerambycidae, containing the following species:

 Gambria bicolor (Chevrolat, 1862)
 Gambria leucozona Bates, 1880
 Gambria nigripennis (Chevrolat, 1862)

References

Trachyderini
Cerambycidae genera